Charaxes turlini is a butterfly in the family Nymphalidae. It is found in Rwanda and north-western Tanzania. The habitat consists of open forests.

References

External links
Images of C. turlini Royal Museum for Central Africa (Albertine Rift Project)
Charaxes turlini images at BOLD
Charaxes turlini f. adelinae at BOLD
Charaxes turlini f. giselae at BOLD
Charaxes turlini f. isabellae at BOLD
Charaxes turlini f. turlini at BOLD

Butterflies described in 1978
turlini